Buddhist Studies Review is a peer-reviewed academic journal published by Equinox.

The journal was founded in 1976 as Pali Buddhist Review by the Pali Buddhist Union, edited by Russell Webb. In 1983 it received its present name under the sponsorship of the Institut de recherche bouddhique Lin-So’n and the Pali Buddhist Union. in 1998 it was taken over by the UK Association for Buddhist Studies, and in 2006 Equinox began publishing it commercially.

See also 
 Buddhist-Christian Studies

References

External links

UK Association for Buddhist Studies

Biannual journals
English-language journals
Equinox Publishing (Sheffield) academic journals
Publications established in 1983
Buddhist studies journals